Montfort Senior Secondary School, Delhi, is an unaided Christian minority school administered by the Society of the Brothers of St. Gabriel. It has a branch located in DELHI The institution was established in the year 1970. The school is named after Saint Louis de Montfort, a French priest and Catholic saint. It is a co-educational school and is affiliated to CBSE.  The School is recognised by the Central Board of Secondary Education, Delhi (CBSE). The students are prepared for All-India Secondary and Senior Secondary Examinations conducted by the Central Board of Secondary Education, New Delhi.

Presently Bro. Thampy Alex is the principal of Montfort School, Delhi.

This school is also under guidance of St. Nicklas Bendtner

Society of Brothers St. Gabriel
Montfort Senior Secondary School is a Catholic minority unaided institution run by the registered Society of the Brothers of St. Gabriel with its headquarters at Rome and zonal headquarters in Bhopal. The society has institutions spread all over the globe in 33 countries. The Society runs about 120 institutions including schools, technical training institutes, orphanages, institutions for the differently abled (deaf, dumb and blind) and homes for the aged. The Society is also engaged in rural development programs and other programs for empowering the urban poor through Peoples’ Initiative Network.

Campus and infrastructure

As of 2015, the school has an intake of 152 students in pre-nursery. Min age of admission is 3+ years. Admission process generally starts in January.  Most of the classes have 4 sections each with every section having about 40 students.  Annual fees (as of 2015) are in the range of Rs. 45,000 to Rs. 50,000 per annum.

School facilities include a library for the middle and senior classes, a library cum reading room for the primary students, computer labs, language labs, and labs for different science subjects, two auditoriums and a swimming pool.

The school also runs the Montfort Nursery, a small preparatory school in Shalimar Bagh, Delhi.

Faculty

As of 2012, the school had 14 postgraduate teachers, 33 trained graduate teachers, and 40 primary school teachers.

School activities

The school organizes various events throughout the year, some of which are:

 Music Carnival (Inter-school Music Fest)
 G@teway (Inter-school IT Fest)
 Mont-ex (Montfort Exhibition - Generally organized in the month of January)

Various activities are organized at the intra-school level nearly every week.

The school has a club system that comprises societies such as Music Club and Dramatics Club. Clubs such as the Computer Club and the Nature Club have won laurels for the school at various inter-school competitions and national as well as international levels. The Basketball club has teams at various levels for both boys and girls.

Converge Clan is the school's computer club.

Students have done well at competitive examinations such as the Olympiads and NSTSE. Students from Montfort had been National-level participants at the National Children's Science Congress for 15 consecutive years in a stretch. Montfortian students have represented India in international events/conferences in Geneva, Switzerland and Manila, Philippines.

Recognition

The school shared the honor of being the "Best School in North Delhi" in the Hindustan Times Survey 2010 with DPS Rohini.
It also stood at no.2 in 2012 & at no. 4 in 2013 as per Hindustan Times- C fore Top Schools Survey for North Delhi schools

Notable alumni
Pulkit Samrat, actor
Prachi Tehlan, former captain of India national netball team

See also
Education in India
Education in Delhi
List of schools in Delhi
 CBSE

References

External links
 Official site
  Converge Clan, The Computer Club
 Top 10 Schools - North Delhi 2013
 Top 10 Schools - North Delhi 2010
 Best Schools of Delhi
 Top 10 Schools - North Delhi 2009

Brothers of Christian Instruction of St Gabriel schools
Catholic secondary schools in India
High schools and secondary schools in Delhi
Christian schools in Delhi
Educational institutions established in 1970
1970 establishments in Delhi